Gianfranco Terrin  is an Italian film and stage actor born in Naples, Italy. He hosted the TV mini-series Movie Surfers airing on the Disney Channel.

He grew up in Pozzuoli, where at the age of ten, director Giuseppe M. Gaudino chose him to play a street urchin in Round the Moons between Earth and See. Soon after, He was in the Italian TV Series Un posto al sole and in the feature film Rosa Funzeca directed by Aurelio Grimaldi. He trained in Italy with Actress Fioretta Mari and moved to Los Angeles, where he was awarded a full scholarship for the Lee Strasberg Institute. He was the main host of the Disney Channel mini TV series Movie Surfers and starred in several feature films, including Bobby Fischer Live, Marlon Brando Unauthorized, and Mont Reve. He filmed a commercial for Fastweb, and played the lead role of Leonard in Il Castello di Azzurrina. In 2012, he produced and directed Hysteria 2012, a short documentary nominated at the California International Short Festival. He played Adam in the Italian version of  La Forma delle Cose (The Shape of Things) at Teatro Brancaccino in Rome. He appeared in CBS's Criminal Minds Beyond Borders. He played Italian gangster Carmine Parone in the 2016 crime drama Live by Night, and Z'Luigino in the Francis Ford Coppola experimental film project Distant Vision (2015).

Filmography

References

Living people
1985 births
Male actors from Naples
Italian male film actors
Italian male stage actors
Italian television presenters